The International Drama Festival in Tokyo (国際ドラマフェスティバル in TOKYO), is an annual award show for excellence in television drama production based in Tokyo, Japan. It is organized by the International Drama Festival in Tokyo Executive Committee and co-organized by the Ministry of Internal Affairs and Communications and the Ministry of Economy, Trade and Industry, and held every October. The award is called the "Tokyo Drama Award".

Categories 
Current Categories

 Series Drama
 The Grand Prix
 Excellent Award
 Single Drama
 The Grand Prix
 Excellent Award
 Local Drama award
 Personal Prize
 Best Performance by an Actor
 Best Performance by an Actress
 Best Performance by an Actor in a Supporting Role
 Best Performance by an Actress in a Supporting Role
 Best Screenplay
 Best Director
 Theme Song Award
 Special Award for Foreign Drama

Award winners

Domestic dramas (series drama)

The grand prix and acting awards

Other categories

Foreign dramas

See also

 List of Asian television awards
 Seoul International Drama Awards
 Shanghai Television Festival

References

External links
j-ba.or.jp

Japanese television awards
Awards established in 2007